The Brisbane Tigers are a rugby league club based at Langlands Park, in the suburb of Coorparoo in Brisbane, Australia. Since 1996, they have competed in the Queensland Cup, having competed in the Brisbane Rugby League from 1934 to 1997, where they won eight premierships.

Formed as Coorparoo in 1917, the club became the Eastern Suburbs Tigers in 1933, commonly referred to as Easts Tigers or Easts. In 2020, the club re-branded as the Brisbane Tigers, keeping their traditional colours of gold and black.

Tigers have begun a new weekly episodic podcast show shared across the Tigers social networks, it is called League & More with John Devine, featured prominently on the 
Brisbane Tigers TigerTV website https://tigertv.net/ which is your place to watch rugby league news, video and photos from the Queensland Rugby League featuring Intrust Super Cup, BHP Premiereship and Hastings Deering Colts (U20s).

History

Easts had competed as Coorparoo in the Brisbane Rugby League premiership from 1917. A highlight of the 1920s was the signing of South Sydney star, Harold Horder as their captain-coach in 1924 and 1925. With the move to district football in 1933 a new club, the Eastern Suburbs District Rugby League club, was formed.

The club struggled on the field during the 1930s and 1940s and was in severe financial trouble. Between 1937 and 1945 the Easts Tigers won just nine of ninety matches, and suffered three winless seasons in 1940, 1944 and 1945. However, in 1946, the club was successfully revived after suffering many defeats during the war years with the re-election of A.G. (Taffy) Welch as club president and the implementation of a completely new management committee. In 1946 no less than twelve teams were registered with the Brisbane Rugby League. Of these teams, ten were semi finalists and seven made the grand finals. The main object was to present to the public a really strong first grade team. The next year, 1947, saw what would probably be the greatest side fielded by the club. Every trophy competed for in the BRL competition and Premiership were won and had no fewer than eleven players selected for Brisbane's Bulimba Cup team.

The Easts Tigers won their next premiership in 1950, and in 1951 the Easts Tigers contested the Grand Final being beaten by Southern Suburbs, This meant that, since the revival of the club in 1946, they had played six grand finals in succession. They reached the semis in 1952 and the grand final in 1953 where they were again beaten by Souths. In 1954, they failed to make the top four so, for the first time in eight years they failed to compete in the semi-finals. The club was to win the Peter Scott Memorial Trophy in the 1960 season but did not have success again until they won the pre-season competition in 1969.

The 15-year premiership drought forced club officials to search for a top coach and in 1965 former international, Clive Churchill was engaged to try to mould the team into a premiership 13. The effect was the club's appearance in the 1968 Grand Final against Past Brothers. Although they lost the Grand Final it sparked a resurgence in the Easts Tigers' performance for years to come and the Easts Tigers won the Woolworths pre-season competition in 1969.

The coach, Ted Verrenkamp, and his successor, captain-coach Des Morris, brought great success to the club providing the Easts Tigers with numerous finals appearances and Grand Final victories throughout the 1970s. This was through the help of arguably the best Queensland Five-eighth before King Wally, Wayne Lindenberg and the local junior talent highlighted by John Lang..

In the Queensland Wizard Cup era, the Easts Tigers have made the Grand Final five times although having lost all matches, the first to the Redcliffe Dolphins in 1997 then losing to the Burleigh Bears in a memorable extra-time final in 2004. They were defeated again in 2013 by Mackay and the next year by the Northern Pride. 2018 saw the disappointment continue as they lost to the Redcliffe Dolphins.

The club is currently led by President, Keith Philips and Chief Executive Officer, Brian Torpy. In 2008, the year of the centenary of rugby league in Australia, the Club celebrated its seventy-fifth anniversary.

On 20 January 2011, through BASES Productions, a family run entertainment group. The Easts Tigers began transmission of a fan-service to help boost the profile of the club and its players called TigerTV, in 2012 TigerTV began live broadcasting of entire matches via the internet; TigerTV has been regularly hosting live stream events of the Easts Tigers with Commentators Mike Higgison, Warren Boland, Gavin Payne, and David Wright. On 6 November 2016, TigerTV transitioned to a 24/7 Streaming Channel with Live and Recorded programming streaming continuously, along with replays and highlights of previous years. On 1 May 2018, play by play commentator Mike Higgison died. TigerTV has paid tribute to Higgison for his contributions in the club, and in Rugby League history. His relief and subsequent replacement is David Wright taking place as play by play commentator.

In 2018, the Easts Tigers rallied towards the end of the season, eventually winning each of the semi-finals, but when confronting old time rival, Redcliffe Dolphins in the Grand Final, the Easts Tigers ultimately came runners-up.

2019 has seen a change in the team line up, with a lot of the juniors and colts moving up to take the club forward, with a dominant first 5 rounds of the QRL competition, they have proven still a strong side, with finals hopes still alive by round 19.

On 18 October 2019, a new Head Coach Craig Hodges starts tenure at Langlands Park, coming fresh from his tenure at the Gold Coast Titans. Hodges, who replaced the sacked Garth Brennan as Gold Coast Titans coach for eight games that year, was announced as the new mentor for the Tigers Intrust Super Cup team in late August, taking over from Scott Sipple. After so many years as a deputy, Hodges, who started his tenure at Langlands Park earlier this month, said the chance to run his own program at a proud and historic club like Easts was too good an opportunity to pass up.

There was much enthusiasm for the 2020 season, but after the first round commenced, the club, and the Queensland Cup competition, were impacted by COVID-19 pandemic and as a result the Queensland Rugby League cancelled its four statewide competitions in 2020 due to the ongoing public health emergency.

The unprecedented decision to bring a premature close the Intrust Super Cup, BHP Premiership, Hastings Deering Colts and Auswide Bank Mal Meninga Cup was made in the interests of the health and safety of players and staff.

The Tigers subsequently paid all its players contracts, and helped retain as much staff as possible. Head Coach Craig and Head of Football Terry Matterson began helping CEO Brian Torpy with renovating the grounds with Mark McDonald. Helping keep Langlands Park clean and fresh.

On 4 September 2020, the club announced their re-branding as the Brisbane Tigers. From the 2021 season onward, the club would play under the new name in the Queensland Cup, Hastings Deering Colts, QRL Women's Premiership and Mal Meninga Cup competitions, but remain as the Eastern Suburbs Tigers for their local and junior teams.

Head Coach Craig Hodges announced on 24 September 2020 that he would resign and move to New Zealand Warriors, the club was thrilled with his appointment and wished him the best of luck. Almost the same time, Terry Matterson expressed an interest in becoming Head Coach of the Tigers, and was approved the following Tuesday. But almost immediately upon the appointment of Kevin Walters to be Coach of Queensland Maroons to become Head Coach of Brisbane Broncos on 30 September, Terry was approached to become assistant Coach and on 15 October 2020, it was announced that Kevin Walters has put together his Holy Trinity with the Broncos coach securing John Cartwright and Terry Matterson as his assistants in a bid to break Brisbane's 15-year premiership drought next season.

Fortunately during this transition, a former Tigers development coach, and previous Head Coach of Souths Logan Magpies, Jon Buchanan came to the club and was announced as the Head Coach on 13 October just before the previous announcement of Terry.

The club is now moving into Preseason 2021 and has announced the Trial dates for Mal Meninga Cup (U18s) and due to COVID-19 cancellations, the Hasting Deering Colts will be an Under 21s competition, a distinction from the usual Under 20s of the previous years.

NRL affiliation
The Easts Tigers were the last team in the Queensland Cup to follow the trend of becoming affiliated with a team from the National Rugby League. After relationships with Cronulla-Sutherland Sharks and the Penrith Panthers, at the end of the 2006 NRL season the New South Wales club South Sydney Rabbitohs announced an alliance with the Easts Tigers as a feeder club for the National Rugby League (NRL) side.

At the end of the 2007 season it was announced that the Rabbitohs and the Easts Tigers would no longer be affiliated due to various conflicting issues, the Easts Tigers instead looked closer to home and struck an affiliate deal with the Brisbane Broncos.

At the end of the 2010 NRL season the Victorian club Melbourne Storm announced an alliance with the Easts Tigers as a feeder club for their NRL side. The partnership with the Easts Tigers allowed the Melbourne Storm to tap into the Easts Tigers' recruitment and development systems in Queensland, as well as providing a club for young Queenslanders recruited by the Melbourne Storm to play at and develop without having to relocate to Melbourne. The affiliation with Melbourne has been extended a number of times, with the latest extension being until the end of the 2024 season.

NRL bid

In March 2020, the Tigers entered the bidding race to win a potential license to join the NRL. In early June, the club filed a trademark for the name "Brisbane Firehawks", which would avoid a naming clash with existing NRL side Wests Tigers.

Players

2022 squad

Melbourne Storm allocated players
Storm splits its squad of NRL and development list players between the Tigers and Sunshine Coast Falcons, with players not required for that weekend’s NRL fixture heading to their Queensland Cup team:

 Jesse Bromwich 
 Xavier Coates
 Tom Eisenhuth 
 Bronson Garlick
 Cole Geyer
 Jordan Grant
 Dean Ieremia 
 George Jennings
 Felise Kaufusi 
 Josh King 
 Nick Meaney 
 Cameron Munster 
 Jayden Nikorima 
 Jonah Pezet 
 Marion Seve 
 Christian Welch

Notable players
In 2008, the Easts Tigers named their 75 Year "Dream Team", which included players from 1933 to 2007. The team consists of 13 players who have played more than 50 games for the club, chosen by a panel of experts.

Internationals
 Neville Broadfoot
 Bill Christie
 Bob Hagan
 Arther Henderson
 Jeff Denman
 John Lang
 John Payne
 Rod Morris

Notable juniors
 Alan Cann
 Patrick Carrigan
 Tonie Carroll
 Ryley Jacks
 Paul Khan
 Kalyn Ponga
 Christian Welch

Results

Queensland Cup
Since the inception of the Queensland Cup in 1996 the Easts Tigers have been fairly successful. Reaching the Grand Final on five occasions, they consistently place in the top half of the table usually making the finals. In 24 years they have made the finals 16 times.

 1996 - 4th
 1997 - Runners Up - 2nd
 1998 - 9th
 1999 - 5th
 2000 - 3rd
 2001 - 4th
 2002 - 4th
 2003 - 9th
 2004 - Runners Up - 2nd
 2005 - 8th
 2006 - 3rd
 2007 - 5th
 2008 - 7th
 2009 - 9th
 2010 - 11th
 2011 - 8th
 2012 - 6th
 2013 - Runners Up - 2nd
 2014 - Runners Up - 2nd
 2015 - 4th
 2016 - 6th
 2017 - 4th
 2018 - Runners Up - 2nd
 2019 - 8th
 2020 - Season cancelled

Brisbane A Grade / FOGS Cup Results
The FOGS Cup is an 6-team competition local Brisbane A Grade competition. It was previously known as the FOGS Cup and was a level below the QRL's Intrust Super Cup. The Easts Tigers have had a team in the Cup since its inception in 2001 and have been the most successful club to date, winning the premiership 8 from 19 seasons.
 2001 - Premiers
 2002 - Premiers
 2003 - Runners-up - 2nd
 2004 - Premiers
 2005 - Premiers
 2006 - 4th
 2008 - Premiers
 2009 - 
 2010 - 
 2011 - 
 2012 - Premiers
 2013 - Premiers
 2014 - Premiers
 2015 - 3rd
 2016 - 6th
 2017 - 5th
 2018 - 4th
 2019 - 4th
 2020 - Withdrew from the competition

Honours

Queensland Cup
 Premierships: None
 Runners Up: 5
 1997, 2004, 2013, 2014, 2018
 Minor Premiership: None

Records
Most Games for Club
196, Scott Sipple
183, Shane Neumann
163, Wade Liddell
156, Isaac Kaufmann
152, Matthew Zgrajewski

Most Points for Club
648, Scott Thorburn
553, Cody Walker
504, Matt Lockyer
394, Billy Walters
358, John Wilshere

Most Tries for Club
81, Shane Neumann
65, Wade Liddell
57, Jarrod McInally
54, Cody Walker
53, Isaac Kaufmann

See also

National Rugby League reserves affiliations

Footnotes

On-line references
 Eastern Suburbs Tigers History retrieved 7 December 2005
 Eastern Suburbs Tigers Statistics retrieved 7 December 2005

External links
 

 
Rugby clubs established in 1917
1917 establishments in Australia
Rugby league teams in Brisbane
Rugby league teams in Queensland
Coorparoo, Queensland